The 1984 European Tour was the 13th official season of golf tournaments known as the PGA European Tour. It was the first year for the tour as an independent entity, having previously been organised by European Tournament Players Division of the Professional Golfers' Association.

The season was made up of 26 tournaments counting for the Order of Merit, and some non-counting "Approved Special Events".

The Order of Merit was won by West Germany's Bernhard Langer, who won four tournaments during the season and finished as joint runner-up in The Open Championship.

Changes for 1984
There were several changes from the previous season, with the addition of the Monte Carlo Open, the Celtic International and the Cannes Open; and the loss of the Martini International and the British Masters. In addition the English Golf Classic was merged with the Lawrence Batley International.

Soon after the schedule was revealed, it was announced that the Bob Hope British Classic had been cancelled; the Sanyo Open was brought forward from October to fill the vacated dates.

Order of Merit name change
The money list reverted to its original title as the "Order of Merit", having been known as the "Official Money List" for the preceding four seasons.

Schedule
The following table lists official events during the 1984 season.

Unofficial events
The following events were sanctioned by the European Tour, but did not carry official money, nor were wins official.

Order of Merit
The Order of Merit was based on prize money won during the season, calculated in Pound sterling.

Awards

See also
List of golfers with most European Tour wins

Notes

References

External links
1984 season results on the PGA European Tour website
1984 Order of Merit on the PGA European Tour website

European Tour seasons
European Tour